Julie Paetsch (born February 23, 1988) is an athlete from Lanigan, Saskatchewan. Currently, she is a two-sport athlete in hockey and football. Selected by the Calgary Inferno in the 2013 CWHL Draft, she is also a competitor for the Saskatoon Valkyries of the Western Women's Canadian Football League.

She also competed with the Canadian national women’s team at the inaugural IFAF World Women's Football Championships in 2010,  which she also did three years later. At the 2013 IFAF Women’s Worlds in Vantaa, Finland, she was named one of the captains for the Canadian team.

Athletic career

Hockey
Prior to joining the Saskatchewan Huskies in 2008, Paetsch competed for the University of Regina Cougars. During the 2009-10 campaign, she participated in 24 games, scoring 10 goals and accumulating 26 assists. Her 26 assists during the 2009-10 stand as the second highest single season total in Huskies history. The following season, she recorded nine goals and 14 assists in 24 contests.

As a fifth-year student, Julie Paetsch was named the 2011-12 Canada West women’s hockey Player of the Year. The Huskies alternate captain, Paetsch finished the season as the Canada West leader in scoring with 34 points. Her 14 goals and 20 assists were accumulated in 24 games as the Huskies enjoyed a won-loss record of 16-6-2. Her seven power play goals and 113 shots ranked fourth overall in the CIS. In ten contests, she had multiple point games, while logging three or more points on four separate occasions. It marked the second time in Saskatchewan history that a skater has been named Canada West MVP. Breanne George claimed the award in 2009-10.

Football
She was on the silver medallist team at the 2010 women's World tackle football Championships in Stockholm, Sweden and in 2013 at Vantaa, Finland. In 2010, she was Canada’s leading rusher with 321 rushing yards. Three years later, despite losing to the United States again in the gold medal match, she was named Canada’s Most Outstanding Player of the Game. At the 2013 IFAF Worlds, Paetsch was the leading tackler for Canada. In the gold medal game against the United States, she led all Canadian players with 11 tackles. She returned one punt for 35 yards and a touchdown in a win against Spain while ranking third on Canada with 101 all-purpose yards.

With the Saskatoon Valkyries, she helped the squad to WWCFL championships in 2011, 2012 and 2013. During the 2011 WWCFL championship game, she scored four touchdowns as the Valkyries defeated the Edmonton Storm by a 35-7 tally. For her efforts, Paetsch was recognized as the game’s Most Valuable Player.

Career stats

Football

Awards and honors
 2010 Canada West Second team Hockey All-star 
2012 Canada West women’s hockey player of the year 
2012 Canada West First Team Hockey All-Star
2011 WWCFL Championship Game Most Valuable Player
2013 Canada’s Most Outstanding Player, Gold Medal Game, IFAF Women’s World Championships

References

1988 births
Living people
Ice hockey people from Saskatchewan
People from Lanigan, Saskatchewan
Regina Cougars ice hockey players
Saskatchewan Huskies ice hockey players
Canadian ice hockey forwards